Muthuvara Mahadeva Temple is a Shiv temple located in Muthuvara, Thrissur city of India. Parashurama, the sixth avatar of Vishnu has installed the idol. The idol is in rowdrabhavam. The temple have one sreekovil for Shiv and another one for Vishnu.

References

Shiva temples in Kerala
Hindu temples in Thrissur district
108 Shiva Temples